A French press, also known as a cafetière, cafetière à piston, caffettiera a stantuffo, press pot, coffee press, or coffee plunger, is a coffee brewing device, although it can also be used for other tasks. In 1923 Ugo Paolini, an Italian, filed patent documents relating to a tomato juice separator and he developed the idea of making a coffee pot with a press action and a filter. He assigned his 1928 patent to Italian designer Attilio Calimani and Giulio Moneta who filed it in 1929.

Nomenclature

In English, the device is known in North America as a French press or coffee press; in Britain and Ireland as a cafetière; in New Zealand, Australia, and South Africa as a coffee plunger, and coffee brewed in it as plunger coffee.

History and design

Over the years, the French press has undergone several design modifications. The first coffee press, which may have been made in France, was the modern coffee press in its rudimentary form—a metal or cheesecloth screen fitted to a rod that users would press into a pot of hot water and coffee grounds. Two French inventors (Mayer and Delforge) patented in 1852 a forerunner of the French press. A patent was filed by a Frenchman, Marcel-Pierre Paquet dit Jolbert, officially published on August 5, 1924.

A coffee press was patented in the United States by Milanese designer Attilio Calimani in 1929. It underwent several design modifications through Faliero Bondanini, who patented his own version in 1958 and manufactured it in French clarinet factory Martin SA under the brand name Melior. Its popularity may have been aided in 1965 by its use in the Michael Caine film The Ipcress File. The device was further popularized across Europe by British company Household Articles Ltd. and Danish tableware and kitchenware company Bodum.

The modern French press consists of a narrow cylindrical beaker, usually made of glass or clear plastic, equipped with a metal or plastic lid and plunger that fits tightly in the cylinder and has a fine stainless steel wire or nylon mesh filter.

Operation

It is sometimes recommended that the grounds be pre-infused with a small amount of hot water. . Plunging slowly is purported to maximize the extraction of the oils and flavonoids from the ground bean. The mesh piston normally does not compress the coffee grounds, as most designs leave a generous space—about —below the piston in its lowest position. If the brewed coffee is allowed to remain in the beaker with the used grounds, the coffee may become astringent and bitter, though this is an effect that some users of the French press consider desirable. 

A French press works best with coffee of a coarser grind than does a drip brew coffee filter, about the consistency of cooking salt. Finer coffee grounds, when immersed in water, have lower permeability, requiring an excessive amount of force to be applied by hand to lower the plunger and are more likely to seep through or around the perimeter of the press filter and into the coffee drink. Additionally, finer grounds will tend to over-extract and cause the coffee to taste bitter. 

Some writers give the optimum time for brewing as around four minutes. Other approaches, such as cold brewing, require several hours of contact between the water and the grounds to achieve the desired extraction.

Variations

French presses are more portable and self-contained than other coffee makers. Travel mug versions exist, which are made of tough plastic instead of the more common glass, and have a sealed lid with a closable drinking hole. Some versions are marketed to hikers and backpackers not wishing to carry a heavy, metal percolator or a filter using drip brew. 

Other versions include stainless steel, insulated presses designed to keep the coffee hot, similar in design to thermos flasks. Coffee filters commonly used in South Indian households are a stainless steel version but without insulation. The decant known as decoction is mixed immediately with milk and sugar to make kaapi. One variation uses a "pull" design: the coffee grounds are placed in a mesh basket, which is then pulled into the lid after brewing, trapping the grounds out of the coffee. Others produce a similar effect by having shutters that can be closed via the top of the press, sealing the grounds off from the coffee entirely. French presses are also sometimes used to make cold brew coffee.

An all-in-one French press consists of a heating element that can receive its power from a 12-volt power source.

Other uses
In the same way as coffee, a French press can also be used in place of a tea infuser to brew loose tea. To some extent the tea will continue to steep even after the plunger is depressed, which may cause the tea remaining in the press to become bitter. It might thus be advisable to decant the tea into a serving vessel after preparation. The same French press should not be used for both tea and coffee unless thoroughly cleaned, as coffee residue may spoil the flavor of the tea. However, this method is more suitable for light teas and is not suitable for Indian Chai (which must be boiled) or Chinese tea (which tends to be diffused for a long time, with tea leaves reused as a rule).

A French press can also be used for straining broth from shellfish or other ingredients.

References

External links

 

Coffee preparation
Articles containing video clips